The 1970–71 Divizia C was the 15th season of Liga III, the third tier of the Romanian football league system.

Team changes

To Divizia C
Relegated from Divizia B
 Chimia Suceava
 Gloria Bârlad
 Chimia Râmnicu Vâlcea
 Metalul Turnu Severin

Promoted from County Championship
 Cimentul Bicaz
 ITA Pașcani
 Olimpia Râmnicu Sărat
 Unirea Tricolor Brăila
 Energia Slobozia
 Vulturul Tulcea
 Victoria Florești
 FC Caracal
 Lotru Brezoi
 Minerul Moldova Nouă
 Unirea Alba Iulia
 CFR Simeria
 Minerul Baia Sprie
 Someșul Beclean
 CFR Sighișoara
 Forestierul Târgu Secuiesc

From Divizia C
Promoted to Divizia B
 Șantierul Naval Oltenița
 CFR Pașcani
 UM Timișoara
 Gloria Bistrița

Relegated to County Championship
 Constructorul Piatra Neamț
 Foresta Ciurea
 Dunărea Brăila
 Locomotiva Adjud
 ITC Constanța
 ICAB Arcuda
 Unirea Câmpulung
 Progresul Balș
 Progresul Strehaia
 Unirea Orșova
 Tehnofrig Cluj-Napoca
 Minerul Baia de Arieș
 Bihoreana Marghita
 Dacia Oradea
 Medicina Târgu Mureș
 Avântul Reghin

Renamed teams
Gloria Bârlad was moved from Bârlad to Slatina and was renamed as Gloria Slatina.

Unirea Focșani was renamed as Automobilul Focșani.

Chimia Gheorghiu-Dej was renamed as Trotușul Gheorghiu-Dej.

Unirea Mânăstirea was moved from Mânăstirea to București and was renamed as Unirea București.

Sportul Muncitoresc București was renamed as TMB București.

Victoria Târgu Jiu was renamed as Pandurii Târgu Jiu.

Dinamo Zalău was renamed as Unirea Zalău.

Metalul Salonta was renamed as Recolta Salonta.

Foresta Năsăud was renamed as Progresul Năsăud.

Energia Slobozia was renamed as Azotul Slobozia

Vulturul Tulcea  and Dunărea Tulcea merged, the first one absorbed the second one and was renamed as Dunărea Tulcea.

Other teams
Topitorul Baia Mare was replaced by Gloria Baia Mare.

Gloria CFR Galați was dissolved and instead was formed FC Galați who took the place in Divizia B from Oțelul Galați.

Dacia Galați took the place of dissolved Gloria CFR Galați.

Meva Drobeta-Turnu Severin took the place of Energetica Drobeta-Turnu Severin.

League tables

Seria I

Seria II

Seria III

Seria IV

Seria V

Seria VI

Seria VII

Seria VIII

Promotion play-off

Group I (București)

Group II (Oradea)

See also 

 1970–71 Divizia A
 1970–71 Divizia B
 1970–71 County Championship

References 

Liga III seasons
3
Romania